Beca may refer to:

 Beca (artist group), group of artists formed in the 1970s in Wales
 Beca Group, engineering and consultancy services companies
 Beca (garment), a form of stole worn on the breast and shoulder by tunos
 Beca (musician), American singer

Persons with the surname
 Andon Beça (1879–1944), Albanian politician
 Damir Beća (born 1969), Bosnian football player and manager
 Matt Beca (born 1986), Canadian ice hockey player
 Ramón Beca (born 1953), Spanish equestrian

See also
 Bangladesh Environment Conservation Act
 Becca, a given name